KIKN-FM (100.5 MHz, "Kickin' Country 99.1/100.5") is a radio station broadcasting a country music format. Licensed to Salem, South Dakota, it serves the Sioux Falls, South Dakota area. The station is currently owned by Townsquare Media.

Its studios are located on Tennis Lane in Sioux Falls, while its transmitter is located near Dolton.

Due to signal issues within Sioux Falls since the transmitter is located over 35 miles from the city, KIKN also had a translator (low power rebroadcaster) at 100.1 FM with the call sign K261CI. The translator went off the air in November 2007, as KDEZ launched on that frequency.

On August 1, 2021, KIKN-FM began simulcasting on KSOO-FM (which dropped their sports/talk format), rebranding as "Kickin' Country 99.1/100.5".

References

External links
Kickin' Country 99.1/100.5

Country radio stations in the United States
IKN-FM
Radio stations established in 1991
Townsquare Media radio stations
1991 establishments in South Dakota